Madombidzha is a township west of Louis Trichardt under the Makhado Local Municipality of the Vhembe District Municipality in the Limpopo province of South Africa.

Populated places in the Makhado Local Municipality